This is a list of the schools and colleges in Tiruvarur district.

A.R.J College of Engineering and Technology
Central University of Tamil Nadu
National Higher Secondary School Mannargudi
Sri Sankara Matriculation Higher Secondary School
Thiruvalluvar Government Higher Secondary School

References 

Tiruvarur
Tiruvarur district